Ronald Demon Moore (born August 10, 1977) is a former defensive tackle in the National Football League. Moore was a member of the Atlanta Falcons during the 2001 NFL season. He was drafted by the Green Bay Packers in the seventh round of the 2000 NFL Draft.

References

Sportspeople from Sanford, Florida
Atlanta Falcons players
American football defensive tackles
Hinds Eagles football players
Northwestern Oklahoma State Rangers football players
1977 births
Living people
Players of American football from Florida